Merna Kennedy (born Maude Kahler; September 7, 1908 – December 20, 1944) was an American actress of the late silent era and the transitional period into talkies.

Career
She was born in Kankakee, one of two children to Maud (née Reed) and John Kahler, a German-American butcher turned chiropractor. After her parents separated, her mother moved the family to California, where she married a grocer two years later, and changed their name to Kennedy. At the outbreak of World War I, their mother prepped seven-year-old Merna and brother Melvin (known as Merle) to tour as a dancing and singing sibling act on the Orpheum and Pantages theater circuits of vaudeville, where she became acquainted with Lita Grey. Merle broke his leg ending the duo, prompting Grey to suggest silent films to Merna. 

Kennedy was best known during her brief career for her role opposite Charlie Chaplin in the silent film The Circus (1928), a role for which she was brought to the attention of Chaplin by her friend Lita Grey, who became Chaplin's second wife in 1924. As a dancer she had muscular legs, which helped her gain the role of the circus bareback rider.  

Kennedy continued acting after The Circus, starring in early sound films, but retired in 1934 when she married choreographer/director Busby Berkeley on February 10, 1934 at Hollywood United Methodist Church. Their marriage broke up by 1936.

Death
Kennedy died at age 36 of a heart attack on December 20, 1944, four days after her marriage to Master Sergeant Forrest Brayton. She is buried at Pinecrest Cemetery in California.

Filmography

Silent Films
 
1928 The Circus
1929 Barnum Was Right
1929 Skinner Steps Out

Talkies
1929 Broadway
1930 The Rampant Age
1930 Embarrassing Moments
1930 The King of Jazz
1930 Worldly Goods
1930 The Midnight Special
1931 Stepping Out
1932 The Gay Buckaroo
1932 Lady with a Past
1932 Ghost Valley
1932 Come On, Tarzan
1932 The All American
1932 The Red-Haired Alibi
1932 I Like It That Way
1933 Laughter in Hell
1933 Emergency Call
1933 Easy Millions
1933 Don't Bet on Love
1933 I Love That Man (scenes deleted)
1933 Arizona to Broadway
1933 Police Call
1933 The Big Chance
1933 Son of a Sailor
1934 Wonder Bar
1934 Jimmy the Gent

References

External links

Merna Kennedy at Virtual History

1908 births
1944 deaths
Actresses from Illinois
American film actresses
American silent film actresses
People from Kankakee, Illinois
20th-century American actresses